"Who Shot Ya" or often "Who Shot Ya?" is a song by Brooklyn, New York, rapper the Notorious B.I.G., also called Biggie Smalls, backed by Sean Combs as the "hype man". Puffy's emerging record label, Bad Boy Entertainment, released it on February 21, 1995, on an alternate reissue of Biggie's single "Big Poppa/Warning," out since December 5, 1994. While this 1994 release climbed the Billboard Hot 100, its new B side "Who Shot Ya"—now Biggie's "most infamous classic," with an instrumental now iconic—revised some vocals of a "Who Shot Ya" track, rapped by Biggie and Keith Murray, already issued on a mixtape from a Harlem DJ earlier in 1995.<ref name=":4222222">Bandini, "DJ SNS liberates the original mixtape version of Biggie's 'Who Shot Ya' with a Keith Murray verse (audio)", AmbrosiaForHeads.com, 17 Mar 2014, embeds a YouTube video of a still image plus audio, and wholly addresses the topic: "One particular standout from Stan Ipcus's stellar feature is the bit on 'Who Shot Ya?.' The controversial song, produced by Nashiem Myrick & Diddy (who chillingly flipped a sample by Isaac Hayes' production partner David Porter), featured some uncharacteristic ad-lib shots from Puff Daddy at the time, and seemed to chide 2Pac into the beef that would transpire less than a year later. Like so many great myths surrounding The Notorious B.I.G. and mid-'90s Bad Boy, SNS maintains that his version, hitting the streets first in 1995, featured Keith Murray. While the Def Squad MC's lyrics would later be re-purposed to a Mary J. Blige interlude, with the interview, SNS digitized this moment in time. K.M., like Biggie, is an amazing lyricist who's never been too far from controversy. Here's what he said: 'I had 'Who Shot Ya' with Keith Murray's verse. To this day, no one still has that record. [Laughs.] You only heard Keith Murray's verse on the Mary [J. Blige My Life interlude]. But his whole verse wasn't on there, [it was just a snippet that faded in and out]. I had the full version.''' " (The italics and brackets are native to this source.)</ref> Recalled as "menacing magic" that helps "define New York rap," "Who Shot Ya" was "controversial and hugely influential." Widely interpreted as a taunt at 2Pac,Carrie Golus, "Tupac shot" & "East Coast vs. West Coast", pp 55 & 56, in USA Today Lifeline Biographies: Tupac Shakur: Hip-Hop Idol (Minneapolis, MN: Twenty-First Century Books/Learner Publishing Group, 2011). the single provoked a "rap battle" between the two rappers,Cheryl Lynette Keyes, Rap Music and Street Consciousness (Urbana & Chicago: University of Illinois Press, 2004), p 168. formerly friends.

Biggie, when interviewed, explained his "Who Shot Ya" lyrics as portraying a rivalry between drug dealers. Sharing the mixtape track's instrumental, the single replaces the Murray verse with a second Biggie verse, and expands Puffy's "hype man" vocals. Beyond a synthesized kick drum added, the instrumental is simply a sample that "chillingly" loops a portion of soul singer David Porter's 1971 song "I'm Afraid the Masquerade is Over," album Victim of the Joke? An Opera.Some sources indicate 1971 release by Craft Recordings, apparently a newer label reissuing some records originally under Concord Music Group, which had sponsored Stax Records. Spotify, for instance, indicates Craft [David Porter, "Victim of the Joke? . . . An Opera" (Craft Recordings/Concord Music Group, 1971), Spotify.com, 2021], as does Apple Music [David Porter, "Victim of the Joe? . . . An Opera" (Craft Recordings/Concord Music Group, 1971), Music.Apple.com, 2021]. Napster, however, indicates Stax [David Porter, "Victim Of The Joke? An Opera" (Stax, 1971), US.Napster.com, Rhapsody International Inc., 2021]. Napster adds, "Stax stalwart and Isaac Hayes' songwriting partner David Porter released the rarest of all breeds in 1971: the Soul concept album. Let's face it; it just wasn't happening. That doesn't mean it was a bad thing. The spoken interludes ramble a bit, and none of the songs became classics, but the energy is great. It's an oddity worth having for collectors and some kitsch aficio" [Ibid.]. A "snippet" of the mixtape track, but Murray's verse, plays in "K. Murry Interlude," a brief skit on Uptown Records singer Mary J Blige's R&B album My Life, coproduced by Puffy, released on November 29, 1994. That day, James "Jimmy Henchman" Rosemond, managing an Uptown Records rapper, booked Tupac to record a cameo. Reaching the studio's Times Square building lobby, Tupac was shot resisting robbery by waiting gunmen.

Tupac instantly blamed Rosemond, and soon suspected privity by Puffy and Biggie.Fab Five Freddy, interviewer, "Mail: Tupac Shakur: The final chapter", Vibe, 1995 Aug;3(6):25–29, where Vibe publishes the most relevant responses to Tupac's January comments published in Vibe's April issue: Andre Harrell & Biggie Smalls on p 25, James "Jimmy Henchman" Rosemond, here called simply "Booker", on pp 25–26, rapper Little Shawn on p 26,  Sean "Puffy" Combs on p 27, and Randy "Stretch" Walker on pp 27 & 29.  (Andre Harrell meanwhile fell from Tupac's suspicions, and Tupac seemingly never quite accused Little Shawn. Incidentally, Fab Five Freddy was an early ambassador of hip hop.) Puffy and Biggie reportedly resumed print silence until interviewed in June 1996 [Joel Anderson, "The B-side that deepened Biggie and Tupac's rift", Slate.com, 13 Nov 2019], yielding a cover story in Vibe's September 1996 issue [The Blackspot, "Stakes is high", Vibe, 1996 Sep;4(7):100–104].Warner Jennifer, Feud: The Birth, Growth, and Fall of Gangsta Rap (Anaheim, CA: Golgotha Press, 2016): pp 48–49 on the November 1994 robbery and shooting at Quad Recording Studios and Tupac's suspicions mainly against James "Jimmy Henchman" Rosemond plus Puffy and Biggie; p 50 on Tupac's October 1995 release from prison, pending appeal, on bail posted via Deathrow Records' CEO Suge Knight for three albums to Death Row; p 51 on the "Who Shot Ya" controversy; p 52 on the production of Tupac's response, "Hit 'Em Up." Once a January jailhouse interview of Tupac, hinting the suspicions, was read in Vibe magazine's April issue, "Who Shot Ya" intervening, "the industry rumor mill was churning." The central persons all disputed Tupac's portrayal, and Biggie called "crazy" the rumors blaming him via "Who Shot Ya" lyrics. Either way, the single's timing was suspect. Out of prison, Tupac answered in June 1996 by the B side "Hit 'Em Up"—accusing and menacing Biggie and Puffy by name—which legendary "diss track"Peter A Berry, "These 20 hip-hop diss tracks are better than the songs they respond to", XXL.com, XXL Mag, Townsquare Media, Inc., 19 Jan 2021, explains, "Tupac Shakur's 'Hit 'Em Up' won't be on this list. The song, which was released after The Notorious B.I.G. dropped 'Who Shot Ya'—the New York rapper recorded the track months before Tupac was shot—doesn't respond to a particular diss track since Biggie's effort wasn't a diss track in the first place." inflamed the rap community's East/West rivalry to its peak.The Blackspot, "Stakes is high", Vibe, 1996 Sep;4(7):100–104, p 104. In Vibe, then, Puffy denied any aggression at Tupac, and Biggie called "Who Shot Ya" initially "the intro to that shit Keith Murray was doing on Mary J Blige's joint." Biggie's puzzling explanation indirectly spotlit Puffy's vocals, shouting East Coast, motherfucker!.

Tupac's fatal shooting in September 1996 and Biggie's in March 1997, both officially unresolved,Robert A Roks, " 'Keeping it (hyper)real': A musical history of rap's quest beyond authenticity", in Dina Siegel & Frank Bovenkerk, eds, Crime and Music (Cham, Switzerland: Springer Nature, 2021), pp 279–280. drew speculations partly blaming the "rap battle."Dorian Lynskey, "Tupac and Biggie die as a result of East/West Coast beef", TheGuardian.com, Guardian News & Media Limited, 12 Jun 2011. Biggie and studio associates who witnessed his "Who Shot Ya" recording have unanimously disputed that it, or Biggie's "saying that phrase," targeted Tupac.Joel Anderson, "The B-side that deepened Biggie and Tupac's rift", Slate.com, Slate Group, 13 Nov 2019. Nashiem Myrick, the main producer, avowed "no reason, no motive, at all, to have set 'Pac up," a query tied to the song.Jake Brown, Jay-Z and the Roc-A-Fella Dynasty (Phoenix, AZ: Colossus Books/Amber Books, 2005), pp 57–58. It was reissued in 1999 on the posthumous Biggie album Born Again, in 2001 on a "Big Poppa/Warning" reissue with remixes,Joel Whitburn, Joel Whitburn's Top Pop Singles 1955–2002 (Menomenee Falls, WI: Record Research, 2003), p 516. in 2004 on a remaster of his 1994 or debut album Ready to Die, and in 2007 on his compilation album Greatest Hits. In 2014, the mixtape version, key inspiration to rapper Jay-Z in 1995,"Notorious B.I.G.: Still the illest", MTV.com, MTV Networks, 9 Mar 2006, archived elsewhere on 24 May 2012, including page 2, Jay-Z: "The world stopped when he dropped 'Who Shot Ya',"  simultaneously archived. drew renewed notice. Rock band Living Colour's music video to a 2016 cover version protests gun violence. Who Shot Ya? is now a trope beyond music.

 Closing another B side 

 Track selection 
In July 1993, Uptown Records' founder Andre Harrell fired his unbridled A&R man and record producer Sean "Puffy" Combs, age 23, whose new label, Bad Boy Entertainment, then found parenting by Clive Davis's Arista Records. By late 1994, Bad Boy prevailed via rapper Craig Mack's hit single "Flava in Ya Ear," yet especially by Bad Boy's first album, Ready to Die, released on September 13, 1994, the debut album of gangsta rapper the Notorious B.I.G., or Biggie Smalls.For swift summary of Biggie's entry into the music industry, see Robert C Schaller Jr, Kanye West: A Biography (Santa Barbara, CA: Greenwood Press/ABC-CLIO, 2009), p 43. The album is mostly grim and hardcore, but Puffy removed "Who Shot Ya" from it.

Biggie wanted the first single to be "Machine Gun Funk." Puffy made the first two A sides instead friendly songs—"Juicy" and then "Big Poppa," songs that Biggie resisted recording—to increase radio appeal and sales, yet placed harder songs as their B sides. The "Big Poppa" B side, "Warning," an album track, thus in practice a "double A side," relies on the instrumental of Isaac Hayes's cover version of "Walk on By," and casts Biggie suspecting that members of his own circle will set up him up for a robbery. Each of the two songs received its own music video."The Notorious B.I.G.—'Warning' (official music video)", The Notorious B.I.G. "Official Artist Channel" @ YouTube, 6 Sep 2011.

 Mixtape version 
An underground "Who Shot Ya" differing—but same instrumental—was released in 1995 before the single. Amid lore of this mixtape version, some speculated that it was a myth. (In 2017, DJ EFN casually ventured that he may have had an underground issue on vinyl in a white sleeve, as used by DJs, before December 1994.) In 2014, when the mixtape "Who Shot Ya" was traced to DJ S&S, a renowned issuer of New York mixtapes in the 1990s, its original audio was publicized. Like a mixtape track, it is only two minutes long—one Biggie verse, 24 bars, then one Keith Murray verse, 23 bars, amid "hype man" Puffy tersely yelling announcements—but the verses are longer than the standard 16 bars.

In 2004, Brooklyn rapper Shawn "Jay-Z" Carter recollected, about the mixtape, "I've heard songs I like, but the last time I remember being truly, truly inspired was when I heard 'Who Shot Ya.' " One night, Kareem "Biggs" Burke, cofounder of Jay-Z's label, Roc-A-Fella Records, drew him to Harlem's 125 Street, entered his car, inserted the tape, and fled. Jay-Z reflects, "He knew that if I heard 'Who Shot Ya?,' it's going to inspire me to make songs even hotter. But that song, it was so crazy. It just had an effect on everybody. The world stopped when he dropped 'Who Shot Ya?' " On Jay-Z's debut June 1996 album's track "Brooklyn's Finest," guest Biggie includes the phrase who shot ya and the word warning.

 Single version 
Closing the week of February 25, 1995, the "Big Poppa/Warning" single—released December 5, 1994—had spent six weeks, including five weeks at No. 1, on Billboard's Hot Rap Singles chart. The single entered the main popular songs chart, the Billboard Hot 100, the week ending January 14 and, enduring 24 weeks, peaked at No. 6 on March 18. Yet on February 21, Bad Boy issued a new "Big Poppa/Warning" with an added B side, "Who Shot Ya," which grew Biggie's menacing persona. The track also includes "hype man" Puffy, previously friendly, yelling in uncharacterisic aggression. The instrumental is basically a repeating portion of soul singer David Porter's 1971 song "I'm Afraid the Masquerade is Over," variously sampled in numerous rap songs. "Who Shot Ya" is among the most influential and historic. In 2020, Vulture.com, owned by New York magazine, ranked it #52 among "100 songs that define New York rap."

Published lyrics may omit Puffy's vocals, repeatedly yelling, in part, "As we proceed— / to give you what you need— / 9-5, motherfuckers— / Get live, motherfuckers— / As we proceed— / to give you what you need— / East Coast, motherfuckers— / Bad Boy, motherfuckers—." Otherwise, one writer estimates, "The story Biggie tells in 'Who Shot Ya?' is simple and brutal. Someone's out to get him, but Biggie gets the drop on his foe." MTV recognizes Biggie's verses for, nonetheless, "using the art of music to make the art of war sound beautiful." "Biggie, menacing as ever," describes a writer in Billboard, "makes use of negative space in his verses that give his threats a biblical intensity." Meanwhile, the instrumental, "deceptively candied," "lends the missive a psychedelic quality." Yet this instrumental was heard briefly by R&B fans since the November 29, 1994, release of Mary J Blige's second album, My Life, first in track one, titled "Intro," and then in track six, "K. Murray Interlude."

Production backstory
In 2014, a publicity piece for New York rap DJ and Hot 97 radio host Funkmaster Flex's new book announced, "The song 'Who Shot Ya' was originally an intro for Mary J Blige's album. Uptown/MCA said it was too hard. The song in its original form had a verse from Big, Keith Murray, and LL Cool J, though LL never did his verse. The song still exists!' "

 My Life recording 
"Who Shot Ya" traces to the Uptown Records recording of R&B singer Mary J Blige's second or November 1994 album, My Life. Its record producers were Carl "Chucky" Thompson, Prince Charles Alexander, and Sean "Puffy" Combs, while Nashiem Myrick, studio manager, "played a big role." Prince Alexander was a Bad Boy regular, whereas Chucky Thompson and Nashiem Myrick were among "the Hitmen," the inner circle of staff record producers at Bad Boy Entertainment.Naima Cochrane, "Music sermon: We've been sleeping on Bad Boy's dream team", Vibe.com, 15 Sep 2019. Puffy began Bad Boy in 1992 while A&R director at, and initially in partnership with, Andre Harrell's Uptown Records.Several interviewees, "How ya living, Biggie Smalls?", TheFader.com, The Fader, Inc., 25 May 2011. The interviewees are Source magazine columnist "Matty C", Uptown Records intern Dan Smalls, Uptown Records founder Andrew Harrell, Biggie's co-manager Mark Pitts, Biggie's first DJ 50 Grand, Biggie's first tour DJ Big Kap, rap journalist Dream Hampton, Brooklyn rapper Buckshot, Biggie's North Carolina acquaintance "Smoke", Biggie's co-manager Wayne Barrow, Bad Boy R&B group 112's manager Courtney "Brother Bear" Sills, Los Angeles rapper/producer DJ Quik, video director Paul Hunter, and Bad Boy VP Jeff Burroughs.

Myrick had joined Bad Boy at its outset in 1993 as "studio intern," but in 1994 was its "production coordinator."J. R. Reynolds, "Combs' Bad Boy label makes good", Billboard, 1995 May 20;107(20):18,23, p 23; Ronin Ro, Bad Boy (New York: Pocket Books, 2001), p 53. Myrick, as the main producer of "Who Shot Ya," recalls Puffy tasking him to make an instrumental for rapper Keith Murray as an interlude on Blige's album. Myrick thus "came up with 'Who Shot Ya' "—or at least its basic instrumental—Myrick recalled in 2013. Despite the "Who Shot Ya" impetus or evolution being retold with some discrepancies across the interviewed witnesses—Biggie himself, Nashiem Myrick, Chucky Thompson, and Biggie's protégé Lil' Cease—agreed is that Puffy declared the result "too hard" for the R&B album.My Life opens with the track titled "Intro," 64 seconds long, which at 22 seconds begins and sustains the "Who Shot Ya" instrumental, without any of its vocals, at low volume under Puffy's speech, soon in dialog with Mary J Blige's. Track six is "K. Murray Interlude," 22 seconds long, which opens with the same instrumental and nearly six bars of Murray's verse, nearly a quarter of his full verse. Midway into Murray's final full line included—My subliminals mix with criminal chemicals—Puffy speaks atop it, "Yo, Big Chuck, put on some of that smooth shit, man." Midway into Murray's next line, all music aborts, whereupon a mechanical noise occurs twice, and the track ends.

 Instrumental mix 
Puffy, savvy on classic records, often told producers exactly what to sample, but sometimes left the task open. In this case, Nashiem Myrick recalls an open task and the initial instrumental confusing Puffy, because the mixing console showed only one audio source, no isolated drum track. The instrumental was simply one sample on loop, the drums native, explained Myrick. Puffy then tasked Jean-Claude "Poke" Olivier, of the Trackmasters production duo, who both worked for Bad Boy, to simply embellish the drums.

Poke's programming of a synthesized kick drum, heavier and "fluffy," on a drum machine completed the instrumental. Otherwise, it is simply a sample from "I'm Afraid the Masquerade is Over" by soul singer David Porter, the Isaac Hayes coproducer who, alike Hayes, and sharing backing vocalists with Hayes, reinterpreted and extended popular hits. Porter's cover version and extension of this 1939 classic is on his "rock/soul opera" concept album, released in January 1971, that became a cult classic, titled Victim of the Joke? An Opera. Chucky Thompson 
Chucky Thompson, interviewed in 2014, recalled a customary occasion of record shopping with Nasheim Myrick, and this time also entering the studio later while Myrick—inclined to scour records for samples—was playing one of these records in search of a portion to sample, then found one, and played it, looping, for hours. Puffy meanwhile, having eventually entered the studio with Biggie, "got the idea to use it as an interlude for Mary's My Life album," recalls Thompson.

Thompson adds, "Biggie originally rapped the verse on the interlude, and he was later replaced by Keith Murray." "The reason why Keith Murray was brought in was due to B.I.G.'s verse on the interlude. If we kept his original verse, Puff would have been forced to place an Explicit Lyrics sticker on the album, and he didn't want to do that to Mary, so they brought Keith Murray in to replace Biggie." "This sample," says Thomas, "ended up being used for the Notorious B.I.G.'s song 'Who Shot Ya.' "

 Nashiem Myrick 
Nashiem Myrick, interviewed in 2013, explained, "Actually, that joint was not meant for Big. We was working on the Mary, My Life, album. Puff came to me and said, 'Listen, I need an interlude beat for Keith Murray.' So one day, I got some time. I'm looking through the stuff in the studio, the CDs and records—boom, boom—I come across this record I always wanted to listen to. It's long, it's like 9 minutes long, 11 minutes long, however. Went through the whole record, came up with 'Who Shot Ya.' Keith Murray came through. LL actually came—do the rap on it—but he couldn't finish it. Puff said, 'Go get your man Big, and get him on that record: we have to have it done by Monday.' It was Friday. Found Big. Big came to the studio, blessed me. And that's history." (LL Cool J, around this time managed by Puffy, was a guest—along with Biggie, Busta Rhymes, and Rampage—on a remix of Bad Boy's first single, Craig Mack's "Flava in Ya Ear.")

 Junior M.A.F.I.A. 
Biggie, when variously interviewed and asked about "Who Shot Ya," explained the lyrics as portraying a young drug dealer's turf war against an older drug dealer, that "I wrote," and that it "was finished," too, "way before" late November 1994. "It was supposed to be the intro to that shit Keith Murray was doing on Mary J. Blige's joint," Biggie asserted. Mainstays at Biggie's recording sessions were members of his rap clique Junior M.A.F.I.A., especially Lil' Cease, who recounts his alliance with Biggie from their Brooklyn neighborhood, whom Biggie brought into the music industry, and who seemingly was one of only two persons within the music industry whom Biggie thoroughly trusted. In 2017, Cease indicated that "Who Shot Ya" recording, too, was "way before" late November 1994, but that "Keith Murray, LL Cool J, and Big" were the original artists on "Who Shot Ya," planned as "the intro to Mary J, My Life, album." Cease added that once this original was rejected as "too hard" for her album, Biggie took it and, adding a verse to replace Keith Murray's verse, made it his own.

 Industry rumor mill 
The November 1994 attack on Tupac was a turning point in American popular music. Although Biggie never conceded the accusation, "Tupac Shakur and a legion of his fans interpreted the Biggie B-side 'Who Shot Ya?' as a troll job," a barely veiled taunt. In any case, a "rap battle" ensued. Tupac's June 1996 answer song, "Hit 'Em Up," taking lyrical menace to unprecedented extreme, was personal and overt, "arguably the most passionate and unhinged diss record in history." Tupac had been otherwise incarcerated across 1995 into October, but associating menace and homicide began before Tupac's release from prison.Cathy Scott, The Killing of Tupac Shakur, 3rd edn. (Las Vegas: Huntington Press, 2014), p 241. The new trend in rap culture promptly figured into pop culture.

 Lost friendship 
In May 1993, on Bad Boy's first visit to Los Angeles, Biggie, upon his first single, "Party and Bullshit," sought and met Tupac. In August and September, in New York to rap, Tupac visited Biggie in Brooklyn, and they rapped shows together in Manhattan. Biggie joined Tupac and Randy "Stretch" Walker—of the Live Squad rap/production team from Queens, New York—yielding a new trio of running, rapping, and recording mates.Tayannah Lee McQuillar & Fred L. Johnson III, Tupac Shakur: The Life and Times of an American Icon (Philadelphia: Da Capo Press, 2010), pp 150–151. Yet in July, Puffy's firing from Uptown Records paused Biggie's album recording, an 18 months total while Biggie struggled financially.Shani Saxon, producer, "Back 2 the essence: Friends and family reminisce over hip hop's fallen sons", Vibe, 1999 Oct;7(8):100–116, wherein pp 110–116 cover Biggie and p 112 covers his entry to the music industry. Puffy placed Biggie as guest on two more singles, Mary J. Blige's "What's the 411?" remix and Super Cat's "Dolly My Baby."

Tupac, star of the films Juice and Poetic Justice had his second album Strictly 4 My N.I.G.G.A.Z... (1993) yield his first Top 20 hits on the US Billboard Hot 100 chart, "I Get Around" and "Keep Ya Head Up". In November, in New York shooting March 1994 film Above the Rim, he socialized much with underworld boss Jacques "Haitian Jack" Agnant.Justin Tinsley, " 'Hip Hop Uncovered' tells the story of the feared 'Haitian Jack' ", TheUndefeated.com, ESPN Enterprises, Inc., 12 Feb 2021. Brooklyn boxer Mike Tyson advised Tupac, "I think you're out of your league." Tupac's first Rolex purchase was to enter Agnant's circle. Biggie recalled presence at the purchase, but Tupac's thereupon maybe favoring company wealthier than Biggie, who warned Tupac to avoid Agnant. Tupac, feeling Agnant a friend, reportedly told him of the advice, causing Biggie backlash from Agnant's circle.

In June 1996, Biggie reflected, "There's shit that motherfuckers don't know. I saw the situation and how shit was going, and I tried to school the nigga." "He knows when all that shit was going down, I was schooling a nigga to certain things, me and Stretch—God bless the grave." Stretch died in an unsolved shooting on November 30, 1995. "But he," Biggie said of Tupac, "chose to do the things he wanted to do. There wasn't nothing I could do. But it wasn't like he wasn't my man." By the November 30, 1994, nonfatal shooting of Tupac, he and Biggie, as write retrospective sources lacking details, either were simply still "friends," or had sustained "smaller kerfuffles," or, per street rumors, "had a war brewing."

1994 shooting
Tupac recalled Jacques "Haitian Jack" Agnant introducing him to James "Jimmy Henchman" Rosemond, who recalled instead introducing Tupac to Agnant.Ethan Brown, "The score", Vibe, 2005 Dec;12(14):182–187,220–222, pp 187. Both fearsome in New York City's criminal underworld, Agnant and Rosemond were managers and promoters reputed to extort and rob disfavored music artists. On November 29, 1994, Rosemond hired Tupac to record at Quad Recording Studios with his client Little Shawn, rapper, Uptown Records, and record producer Bryce Wilson.Jamil Lindsey, interviewer, "Bryce Wilson: The night Tupac was shot at Quad Studio & Groove Theory's smash hit 'Tell Me' ", The Real Gully TV @ YouTube, 14 Mar 2020, wherein 08:15 begins Wilson's discussion of working with James "Jimmy Henchman" Rosemond and 09:43 begins Wilson's account of events in the studio that night. Tupac, amid "major beef" with Agnant, and confronted by Rosemond for it on November 25, was leery. Present was Uptown's boss Andre Harrell, summoned by Rosemond. Rosemond recalled "plenty of people." Tupac recalled "about 40." Little Shawn, as if "everybody must have known this cat was coming," recalled it "like a fucking party." Puffy, hanging out, recalled nearby filming for the "Warning" music video, then going to visit Biggie on a higher of Quad's five floors, but getting sidetracked on this floor, Quad's required reception stop.

Biggie, although sometimes reportedly with Puffy, Harrell, and Rosemond when Tupac arrived upstairs, was instead on a higher floor recording with his own rap group, Junior M.A.F.I.A. Near 12:30 AM, Tupac, Stretch, and two other men entered the building lobby, where Tupac was shot resisting successful robbery of $40 000 of jewelry. Stretch's manager, Freddie "Nickels" Moore, was nonfatally shot in the abdomen, "but that," Tupac later said, "was the bullet that went through my leg." Once upstairs, Tupac instantly blamed Rosemond, and later grew convinced of his guilt.Vladislav "DJ Vlad" Lyubovny, interviewer, Mutah "Napoleon" Beale, interviewee, "Flashback: Napoleon (Outlawz) on Jimmy Henchman threatening 2Pac", VladTV–DJVlad "Verified" channel @ YouTube, 12 Nov 2018. Tupac would ultimately question lobby events as to Stretch, others' reactions upstairs, and "Who Shot Ya" release.Interview of Mutah "Napoleon" Beale, "Why would Biggie drop 'Who Shot Ya' after 2Pac got shot? Jimmy Henchman set up 2Pac not Haitian Jack", The Art of Dialogue "Verified" channel @ YouTube, 4 Jul 2021: time mark 01:15 raises the question of whether Tupac shot himself, and 09:25 raises the issue of "Who Shot Ya" release. In response, Tupac would eventually record "Hit 'Em Up," assailing Biggie and Puffy, whereas "Against All Odds," released posthumously, assails Agnant and Rosemond for setting him up. By then or eventually, each complained about Tupac's airing names and gripes in the media and allegedly fostering cinematic drama in his own life.Interviewed for a 2017 documentary, Jacques "Haitian Jack" Agnant acknowledged that Tupac's comments reported in the New York Daily News led to the November 1994 setup of Tupac at Quad Recording Studios, but indicated that he himself had earlier issued word to not retaliate, whereas one of his own associates, allegedly rogue, called immediately after the attack to claim credit for it [Soledad O'Brien & Ice-T, interviewers, "Haitian Jack", interviewee, Who Shot Biggie & Tupac? (USA: Critical Content, 2017), originally aired 24 Sep 2017, Fox network, Fox Entertainment. This alleged associate is rumored to be James "Jimmy Henchman" Rosemond [Rocko Rathon, "[https://thesource.com/2015/02/06/haitian-jack-speaks-on-1994-tupac-shakur-shooting-insinuates-jimmy-henchmans-involvement Haitian Jack speaks on 1994 Tupac Shakur shooting, insinuates Jimmy Henchman's involvement]", TheSource.com, Source Digital, Inc., 6 Feb 2015].

 Key accusations 
For a November 1993 incident in his Midtown Manhattan hotel suite, Tupac Shakur's November 1994 trial led to December 1 conviction of sexual abuse, first degree, for groping.Penelope Petzold & Ron Formica, "Tupac Shakur trial: 1994–95", Great American Trials, Encyclopedia.com, Cengage, 22 Sep 2021. On February 7, 1995, denied probation, he received prison—four years and six months—parole eligibility in 18 months. A January 1995 jailhouse interview of Tupac—disavowing his own "Thug Life" ethos, vowing only directly positive acts, and leery at conduct by Stretch during and by others upstairs after the November 1994 shooting—appeared in Vibe's April issue. It, allegedly, "accused" Biggie and "blamed" Puffy, or "implicates" them and Andre Harrell. Puffy called it, instead, "open-ended, like me and Big and Andre had something to do with" the attack, a main topic via "Who Shot Ya" when New York radio station Hot 97 interviewed Biggie. Replying in Vibe's August issue, rather, each party but Stretch and Biggie recalled the injured Tupac acting like a movie role.

James "Jimmy Henchman" Rosemond further called Tupac a "coward" who tried "street" ways but failed "the test" and was, "hysterically, talking about, 'Call the police.' " Puffy spoke of empathy and hope his "Thug Life" ethos "is really over," but added, "if you gonna be a motherfuckin' thug, you gots to live and die a thug."Puffy was actually quoted saying "Thug Life shit" [Vibe 3(6):27. Tupac himself, however, had been quoted saying "Thug Life shit" [Vibe 3(3):55. Interviewed for Vibe's November 1996 issue, published after Tupac's September 1996 death, Tupac cited Puffy's proclamation as helping redirect him back to the "Thug Life" ethos [Vibe 4(9):79 ]. Tupac was, Biggie estimated, "the realest nigga in the game," but, recently assailed severely, "was just confused," maybe seeking cover or shelter by the interview, "just shitting on everybody." "And then," Biggie added, "the story just completely got switched around: niggas saying I set him up and I'm the one that got him shot. They're saying that my record 'Who Shot Ya?' is about him." "Niggas was taking little pieces of the song and trying to add it to the story, and that shit is crazy." Stretch called Tupac "my man," but demanded he "recognize what the fuck he's doing"—"telling niggas' names and all that shit" in "the media"—breaking a "street" "rule that's never to be broken."

On November 6, 1994, at a nightclub with a recent movie costar, Tupac met gossip columnist A J Benza, whereby New York's Daily News reported Tupac's viewing his own former codefendant Jacques "Haitian Jack" Agnant as a "hanger-on," maybe a government informant, who caused the rape and gun case.Connie Bruck, "The takedown of Tupac", NewYorker.com, 30 Jun 1997 & The New Yorker, 1997 Jul 7;73(3759). Street gossip then foresaw attack on Tupac. Rosemond, angered, would call the November 30 attack "discipline,"Ethan Brown, "The score", Vibe, 2005 Dec;12(14):182–187,220–222, p 221, interviews James "Jimmy Henchman" Rosemond, who recalls being in Los Angeles with "some Crip dudes" at the House of Blues, a restaurant featuring live music, in December 1995 and confronting Tupac. Henchman recalls uttering, "Dude, you gotta stop telling people that shit. For real, nigga, I don't give a fuck—it could go down right now. Why you blaming Puffy and Biggie? Them niggas ain't got nothing to do with this." Henchman recalls asserting, "Nobody came to rob you. They came to discipline you. That's what happened." Henchman recalls Marion "Suge" Knight, as CEO of Tupac's new record label, Death Row Records, looking over and asking, " 'Pac, everything all right?" But Henchman assesses, " 'Pac knew better than to tell him that something was wrong, because I was so angry." (The "discipline" is reputedly for talking to a reporter about Haitian Jack [Jason Rodriquez, "Pit of snakes", XXL.com, 16 Sep 2011/XXL issue Sep 2011].) but reassert innocence.Sha Be Allah, "Jimmy Henchman addresses 2Pac & Dexter Isaac blaming him for shooting", The Source, 19 Jun 2017. Agnant eventually recounted issuing order to not attack Tupac, but a then close ally, angered by the newspaper story, "especially in New York City," setting up this attack, anyway. Widely viewed as its mastermind, Rosemond alleged that Tupac, being theatrical, "makes a situation to sell records," and recalled ordering Tupac to stop blaming Biggie and Puffy, who "ain't got nothing to do with this." Puffy, citing Tupac's deeming the gunmen's identifies open knowledge on the street, called himself and Biggie "scapegoats."

Reportedly, New York police had within the Bad Boy or Uptown label a confidential informant who named Biggie as the attack's contractor, but government misinformation is possible. Tupac heard street word that Biggie simply withheld warning of it. Rosemond, disputing the storied five gunshot wounds, asserted Stretch's recount of only one gunshot, when a robber's grabbing Tupac's hand, trying to draw the gun, discharged it. Lil' Cease recalls this a consensus—whereby Bryce Wilson cites gunpowder on Tupac's boxers—a variant question of who shot him. Biggie called him, in Vibe's August 1995 issue, "just confused more than anything. You get shot and then you go to jail for something you ain't even do. That could twist a nigga's mind up." But as Vibe's excerpt omitted, Biggie also expressed appall at, he said, "what really went down": pistol-whipping and self-inflicted gunshot but, then, "just getting a little bit too happy with the situation, trying to make movies. Everything was a movie to him."

 Enduring debate 
Biggie consistently disputed that "Who Shot Ya" targeted Tupac. Still, some call it a diss track,Siobhan Graham, "On This Day: Legendary rapper Tupac Shakur shot at a stoplight", Yahoo.com, Yahoo! News Australia, 6 Sep 2021. if "subliminal." Biggie recorded his lyrics "months" before Tupac was shot in November 1994, but Puffy removed the song from Biggie's album, released in September 1994. On both the mixtape track and the B side, however, Puffy shouts, "9-5." Naima Cochrane, who "went on to work at Bad Boy" after working at a law firm that "represented the full roster of producers" at Bad Boy, judges, " 'Who Shot Ya' sounds exactly like a track that accidentally launched rap's biggest feud between Biggie and Tupac."

In 2009, the biographical film Notorious was released, and Rahman Dukes, who with coworkers had done research for it, announced, "Biggie himself clears up 'Who Shot Ya' misunderstanding." Dukes prefaces that Lil' Cease, who was Biggie's main rap buddy, as well as DJ Mister Cee, who had discovered Biggie, denied it as a Tupac taunt. Dukes adds, "Hell, even Diddy"—formerly Puffy—"shot down those claims." Dukes asserts, "Only the late, great B.I.G. could clear matters up, but we all know that's not possible." Dukes reports a "long-lost freestyle" with "a few bars," "a bit of hard-core evidence," but leaves it for listeners to judge.

On the other hand, in 2010, rap magazine XXL assessed "8 subliminal diss records" and appraised, " 'Who Shot Ya?' remains highly contested, but the lyrics to 'Long Kiss Good Night' were even more direct." "In the April 2003 issue of XXL, Lil' Cease confirms the record was aimed at 'Pac, while Puff contends that 'If Biggie was going to do a song about 2Pac, he would have just come out with it and said his name.' " Released posthumously, "Long Kiss Goodnight" itself features Puffy's ad lib disclaimer—And we ain't talking about no other rap niggas—but this song, nonetheless, "was definitely about 'Pac, no 2 ways about it," concludes XXL by citing other lyrics.XXL meanwhile estimated about "Who Shot Ya?" that "the timing of its release and the perceived subliminal shots"—including allegedly "telling lyrics" in Biggie's second verse, new in the single—"lead us to believe that this was most likely a diss record." In 2014, however, Bad Boy staff producer Chucky Thompson, key in Ready to Die production, and witness to "Who Shot Ya" production, asserted, "I still have that recording with me today, and him saying that phrase had absolutely nothing to do with Tupac." Nashiem Myrick, the song's main producer, asserted, "We have no reason, no motive, at all, to have set 'Pac up. What's the motive? What's the issue? It's no issue. So, nah."

However, in August 2022, former Bad Boy Records president Kirk Burrowe's admitted on Youtube that the Notorious B.I.G.'s song "Who Shot Ya?" was indeed intended for Tupac.  Burrowes then candidly explains himself, elaborating that the artists may not have known but that his former record label boss Sean Combs thinks in different dimensions at once, explaining one is to the lower level and masses to understand, a level in between, and a higher level of principalities and power basis, in what he calls 3-dimensional chess.  He explains that "Who Shot Ya?" could mean different things to different people, i.e. artists Notorious B.I.G. and/or Lil Cease, but it did what it was supposed to do, and that was intentionally address Tupac's shooting and benefit Bad Boy Records commercially.  Burrowes states it was an "idea" meant to "aggrivate a wound" and act like they didn't intend it afterward.  Burrowes closes by stating, "We did poke at them with that and we acted like we didn't but you know we did, Ya."

Certifications

ReleasesReady to Die (Remaster edition)Born AgainGreatest Hits''
"Big Poppa" 12" single

Notes

The Notorious B.I.G. songs
1994 songs
Songs written by the Notorious B.I.G.
Gangsta rap songs
20th-century controversies in the United States
1990s controversies
Music controversies